Montmort-Lucy is a commune in the Marne department in north-eastern France.

See also
Communes of the Marne department
Château de Montmort

References

Montmortlucy